Charles Cameron of Lochiel (c. 1737 – 31 August 1776) was a Franco-Scottish nobleman, the 21st Lochiel of Clan Cameron. His father was Sir Donald Cameron of Lochiel, known by the sobriquet Gentle Lochiel. In French and Jacobite peerage he was the 4th Lord Lochiel.

Born in Paris, France to exiled parents, he was first enlisted as an officer in the French service. Having outlived his elder brothers John, 20th Lochiel (died 1762) and James (died 1759), the latter having fought in the French and Indian War, Charles succeeded as the Chief of the Camerons. He later served in the 78th Fraser Highlanders and was due to proceed to America with his company to fight in the Revolutionary War. However, upon arriving in Glasgow in late 1776 he died unexpectedly. The bells of the Tolbooth were rung in honour of his father — the Gentle Lochiel.

Family 
In 1767 he married Martha Marshall in Gibraltar and was the father of Donald Cameron, 22nd Lochiel (1769–1832), and Archibald Cameron (born 1774), a Bombay merchant and midshipman of the East India Company. 

His uncle, Dr Archibald Cameron of Lochiel, was controversially convicted of treason for a supposed plot against George II and his part in 1745 Rising. He was hung, drawn and beheaded at Tyburn in 1753 and was the last Jacobite to be executed.

References 

Year of birth uncertain
1737 births
1776 deaths
Clan Cameron
Scottish clan chiefs
18th-century Scottish people